Olearia aglossa, is a shrub in the family Asteraceae and is found in mountainous terrain in New South Wales and Victoria in Australia. It is a small shrub with spreading upright branches and white daisy-like flowers.

Description
The ascending branchlets are light brown becoming grey and thickly covered with soft very small T-shaped hairs. The leaf upper surface is dark green,  flat, smooth and ending in a point. The leaf underside is grey or brownish in colour and densely covered with short, soft, matted hairs. The leaves have a leathery texture, with an obscure network of veins and the margin slightly rolled under. The floret centres are yellow. The white flowers appear from December to February.

Taxonomy and naming
This daisy bush was first formally described in 1899 by Ernst Betche and Joseph Maiden who gave it the name Olearia alpicola var. aglossa in Proceedings of the Linnean Society of New South Wales from specimens collected by William Baeuerlen near Jindabyne in 1890. In 1991 Nicholas Lander raised the variety to species status as Olearia aglossa. The specific epithet (aglossa) is derived from the Ancient Greek word glossa meaning "tongue" with the prefix "a-" meaning "not" or "without", referring to the absence of a distinct ligule on the marginal florets.

Distribution and habitat
This species in found in the Southern Tablelands, south from  the Kosciuszko National Park in New South Wales and is a rare species in the Victorian Alps. It grows in mountainous locations in dry sclerophyll forest.

References

Flora of New South Wales
Flora of Victoria (Australia)
adenoglossa
Plants described in 1899
Taxa named by Ernst Betche
Taxa named by Joseph Maiden